Tillandsia floribunda is a species in the genus Tillandsia. This species is native to Ecuador.

Cultivars
 Tillandsia 'Cataco'

References

BSI Cultivar Registry Retrieved 11 October 2009
Photos from anwyl.com

floribunda
Flora of Ecuador